Lenz, Oregon may refer to the following unincorporated communities in the United States:

Lenz, Hood River County, Oregon
Lenz, Klamath County, Oregon